Street Hoops is a streetball video game released in 2002. It was developed by Black Ops Entertainment and published by Activision. The game has real life streetballers such as 1/2 Man 1/2 Amazing and Hot Sauce. It is possible to create custom baller, and play on real life courts. The game has 3 different modes: World Tournament, Lord of the Court, and Pick-up Game.

Gameplay

World Tournament
In this mode of gameplay, the players team travels across the U.S. to take on teams at various courts. There are unlockable, new courts, secret courts, and better, more skilled ballers. This is the story mode of the game. There are some things that players have to pay to unlock, and there are even more things that players have to beat the mode several times to unlock. This is a 1-Player mode, with the ability to have other human players on a player's teams. However, the earning from this mode will only be saved to the progress of the first user. Progression through the mode is through the first player, as well. Other human players merely serve as teammates from game to game.

Lord of the Court
This mode of play is the opposite of the World Tournament mode. The controlling player plays as the home court and other teams come to challenge them. If the controlling player can keep everybody off their "turf", they can unlock streetball movies, secret characters and clothes. This is a 1-Player mode, with the ability to have other human players on the controlling player's teams. However, the earning from this mode will only be saved to the progress of the first user. Progression through the mode is through the first player, as well. Other humans players merely serve as teammates from game to game.

Pick-Up Game
This is the exhibition mode of the game. The player can choose to play either a full or half court game, on the court and with the teams of their choosing-provided that they are already unlocked through World Tournament. This is the game's multiplayer mode. In this mode, every user on the winning team will earn $100 per game.

Reception

The game received "mixed" reviews on all platforms according to video game review aggregator Metacritic.

References

External links

 http://www.streethoopsgame.com/

2002 video games
PlayStation 2 games
GameCube games
Xbox games
Basketball video games
Activision games
Sports video games set in the United States
AND1
Video games developed in the United States
Black Ops Entertainment games
Multiplayer and single-player video games

pt:Street Slam